The following is a list of transfers for the 2013 North American Soccer League Fall Season.

Transfers

References 

2013
Transfers
North American Soccer League
North American Soccer League